Deirdre Crampton (born 26 March 1976) is a Canadian sailor. She competed in the Yngling event at the 2004 Summer Olympics.

References

External links
 

1976 births
Living people
Canadian female sailors (sport)
Olympic sailors of Canada
Sailors at the 2004 Summer Olympics – Yngling
Sportspeople from Toronto